Sigurd Verdal (4 June 1927 – 27 August 2010) was a Norwegian politician for the Labour Party.

Verdal was born in Eiken. He was elected to the Norwegian Parliament from Vest-Agder in 1981, and was re-elected on two occasions. He had previously served in the position of deputy representative during the terms 1973–1977 and 1977–1981.

Verdal was a member of Audnedal municipality council in the periods 1969–1971 and 1971–1973. In 1969–1971 he was also a member of the Vest-Agder county council.

References

1927 births
2010 deaths
Labour Party (Norway) politicians
Members of the Storting
20th-century Norwegian politicians